This is a list of bridges and other crossings of the Tennessee River from the Ohio River upstream to its source(s).

Crossings

See also
 
 
 
 
 
 List of crossings of the Ohio River

Tennessee River
Tennessee River
River crossings
River crossings
River crossings